Chapman Field may refer to:

 Chapman Field (airfield), a former military airfield in South Miami, Florida, United States
 Chapman Field (baseball), a baseball and softball park in Corpus Christi, Texas, United States
 Chapman Field (Miami), a government facility in South Miami-Dade County, Florida, United States
 Chapman Field Park, an urban park in metropolitan Miami, Florida, United States
 Chapman Memorial Field, an airport in Centerburg, Ohio, United States

See also
 Chapman Stadium, football field in Tulsa, Oklahoma